Amir Seyedbagher Rezaei (born 19 September 1987) is an Iranian footballer who plays for Shirin Faraz in the IPL.

Club career
Seyedbagher Rezaei  joined Shirin Faraz in 2010

Club career statistics

References

1983 births
Living people
Rah Ahan players
Pas players
Iranian footballers

Association footballers not categorized by position